Mtavari Arkhi is a private TV company in Georgia. Established on August 17, 2019, it began airing on September 9, 2019. The General Director of the channel is Nika Gvaramia. Zaza Okuashvili owns 40% of the channel, Nika Gvaramia owns 12%. Most of the channel's team consists of people who left Rustavi 2.

It broadcasts throughout Georgia, both open air and via satellite, through cable operators and IP televisions.

References

External links
 Official site
 
 
 

Television stations in Georgia (country)
Mass media in Tbilisi
Mass media companies of Georgia (country)
Companies based in Tbilisi
Television channels and stations established in 2019
Mass media companies established in 2019
2019 establishments in Georgia (country)
Georgian-language television stations